Magyarszombatfa is a village in Vas county, Hungary. The Slovenian potter Károly Doncsecz studied here.

References

External links 
 Street map (Hungarian)

Populated places in Vas County